Thysanotus is a genus of perennial herbs in the family Asparagaceae, subfamily Lomandroideae. They are mostly native to  Australia with 45 of the 50 known species occurring in Western Australia alone, although a few species range northward into New Guinea and Southeast Asia as far north as southern China.

Species include:

 Thysanotus acerosifolius Brittan  - Western Australia
 Thysanotus anceps Lindl. -  Fringe-Lily - Western Australia
 Thysanotus arbuscula Baker  - Western Australia
 Thysanotus arenarius Brittan  - Western Australia
 Thysanotus asper Lindl. - Hairy Fringe-lily - Western Australia
 Thysanotus banksii R.Br. - Western Australia, Northern Territory, Queensland, New Guinea
 Thysanotus baueri R.Br. - Mallee Fringe-lily.  - Western Australia, South Australia, Victoria, New South Wales
 Thysanotus brachiatus Brittan  - Western Australia
 Thysanotus brachyantherus Brittan   - Western Australia
 Thysanotus brevifolius Brittan   - Western Australia
 Thysanotus chinensis Benth. - Fujian, Guangdong, Guangxi, Taiwan, Indonesia, Malaysia, Philippines, Thailand, Vietnam, New Guinea, Western Australia, Queensland, Northern Territory
 Thysanotus cymosus Brittan  - Western Australia
 Thysanotus dichotomus (Labill.) R.Br. - Branching Fringe-lily - Western Australia
 Thysanotus exiliflorus F.Muell.  - Western Australia, South Australia, Northern Territory
 Thysanotus fastigiatus Brittan  - Western Australia
 Thysanotus formosus Brittan - Western Australia
 Thysanotus fractiflexus Brittan  South Australia (including Kangaroo Island)
 Thysanotus gageoides Diels  - Western Australia
 Thysanotus glaucifolius Brittan  - Western Australia
 Thysanotus glaucus Endl.  - Western Australia
 Thysanotus gracilis R.Br. - Western Australia
 Thysanotus isantherus R.Br.  - Western Australia
 Thysanotus juncifolius (Salisb.) J.H.Willis & Court - South Australia, Victoria, New South Wales, Queensland
 Thysanotus lavanduliflorus Brittan - Western Australia
 Thysanotus manglesianus Kunth - Fringed Lily - Western Australia
 Thysanotus multiflorus R.Br.  - Many-flowered Fringe-lily - Western Australia
 Thysanotus newbeyi Brittan - Western Australia
 Thysanotus nudicaulis Brittan   - Western Australia, South Australia
 Thysanotus parviflorus Brittan  - Western Australia
 Thysanotus patersonii R.Br. - Twining Fringe-lily - Western Australia, South Australia, Tasmania, Victoria, Queensland, New South Wales
 Thysanotus pauciflorus R.Br.- Few-lowered Fringe-lily - Western Australia
 Thysanotus pseudojunceus Brittan   - Western Australia
 Thysanotus pyramidalis Brittan  - Western Australia
 Thysanotus ramulosus Brittan - Western Australia
 Thysanotus rectantherus Brittan  - Western Australia
 Thysanotus sabulosus Brittan  - Western Australia
 Thysanotus scaber Endl. - Western Australia
 Thysanotus sparteus R.Br. - Western Australia
 Thysanotus speckii Brittan  - Western Australia
 Thysanotus spiniger Brittan  - Western Australia
 Thysanotus tenellus Endl. in J.G.C.Lehmann - Western Australia, South Australia
 Thysanotus tenuis Lindl. - Western Australia
 Thysanotus teretifolius Brittan  - Western Australia
 Thysanotus thyrsoideus Baker  - Western Australia
 Thysanotus triandrus (Labill.) R.Br. - Western Australia
 Thysanotus tuberosus R.Br. - Common Fringe-lily  - New Guinea, Queensland, New South Wales, Victoria
Thysanotus unicupensis Sirisena, T.D.Macfarl. & Conran - Western Australia
 Thysanotus vernalis Brittan  - Western Australia
 Thysanotus virgatus Brittan  - New South Wales
 Thysanotus wangariensis Brittan - South Australia

See also

 List of plants known as lily

References

 
 

Asparagaceae genera
Lomandroideae